Karl Einbund's first cabinet was in office in Estonia from 19 July 1932 to 1 November 1932, when it was succeeded by Konstantin Päts' fourth cabinet.

Members

This cabinet's members were the following:

References

Cabinets of Estonia